Jeffrey Vinokur (born August 24, 1990), also known as Dr. Jeff and The Dancing Scientist, is an American scientist, science communicator and entrepreneur known for hosting over 100 episodes of educational science shows used in classrooms in the United States. As of November 2021, the educational streaming video platform he created is used in 30% of all schools in America. 

He is also known for combining the hip hop dance genre of popping with live science demonstrations. He has performed on Good Morning America, The Today Show, The View, Rachael Ray,  America's Got Talent, and Discovery Channel, as well as at the World Science Festival, Smithsonian Institution, and the USA Science and Engineering Festival.

Early life
Jeffrey Vinokur was born in 1990 to Russian immigrant parents and attended Montvale Public Schools. His early interest in science was fueled by doing kitchen science experiments in elementary school, which later progressed to creating a chemistry lab in his parents' garage at age 14, where he would do amateur experiments like making sodium metal from household supplies. Vinokur began conducting biochemistry research at age 15 at Rutgers University.

While a senior at Pascack Hills High School, he began learning the hip-hop dance genre of "popping" through online videos and DVDs. He later traveled to New York City to take classes from leading practitioners of the dance style such as Jazzy J of The Electric Boogaloos. Afterwards he began posting dance tutorials on YouTube under the username "TheRussianTiger," and the videos have since garnered millions of hits.

Vinokur first combined science and dance together while attended the University of Wisconsin–Madison as a biochemistry major where he conducted biofuels research. He received guidance from UW-Madison chemistry professor Bassam Shakhashiri, UW-Madison physics professor Clint Sprott, and lecture demonstrator Jim Maynard. The performance was later premiered on America's Got Talent in 2010.

Career

TV & Media Appearances
Vinokur premiered as "The Dancing Scientist" on the fifth season of America's Got Talent where he successfully placed in the Top 100 acts out of 70,000 auditions. The America’s Got Talent appearance lead to Vinokur hosting a monthly science segment on the local CBS News in Madison, Wisconsin beginning in 2011. The local news appearances lead to him co-hosting a series of science segments on the Discovery Channel (Canada) show Daily Planet in 2012. 

In 2014, Vinokur began performing science demonstrations on national TV talk shows, with appearances on The Today Show, The View, Rachael Ray, The Queen Latifah Show, Fox & Friends, Home & Family, AMHQ With Sam Champion, as well as internationally on "Nippon-yo! Sekai-wo Taose! FUJIYAMA," a show on Fuji TV in Japan.
  
In 2020, Vinokur appeared in a Super Bowl commercial for TurboTax and hosted educational science content for Walmart.

Live Shows
Vinokur’s stage show called “So You Think You Can Do Science?” has been performed at the World Science Festival, Liberty Science Center, Maryland Science Center, Saint Louis Science Center, USA Science and Engineering Festival, Caltech, Singapore Science Festival, Smithsonian Institution, and toured over 400 schools nationwide.

Generation Genius
In 2017, Vinokur founded and became CEO of Generation Genius, Inc. The educational technology company produces educational videos in partnership with the National Science Teaching Association.

Generation Genius raised $2.7 million in seed funding which included contributions from the Howard Hughes Medical Institute and over $1 million raised from equity crowdfunding.

Vinokur hosts three original series on the platform, consisting of over 100 episodes, covering science topics taught in grades K-8 science. 

In 2020, Pitchbook ranked Generation Genius #2 on its list of "50 Hottest Startups in LA." As of Nov 2021, Generation Genius videos, hosted by Dr. Jeff, are used by 3 million students each week with subscriptions in more than 30% of all elementary schools in the United States.

Scientific Research
Vinokur received a PhD in "Biochemistry, Molecular and Structural Biology" from UCLA in 2017. During his graduate studies, he published research on the discovery of new enzymes, protein structures and a new biochemical pathway in ancient bacteria that grow in some of the most extreme conditions on Earth.

His research shows how some enzymes are able to work in harsh conditions and how they can potentially be modified to produce biofuels. For his research, Vinokur is a recipient of the NSF Graduate Research Fellowship, NIH-UCLA Chemistry Biology Interface Fellowship, and Audree Fowler Award in Protein Science.

Personal life
Vinokur has stated publicly that he almost never uses personal social media despite having a career working in media and multiple verified accounts. In an interview, he states, "I'm not active on a personal level on social media... I don't want to be spending time thinking of interesting things to say and taking pictures of my food... I just want to eat quick and get back to growing Generation Genius to reach as many kids as possible."

See also
Popping
Clint Sprott
Bill Nye
Mr. Wizard

References

External links

Living people
1990 births
21st-century American chemists
Popping dancers
Pascack Hills High School alumni
People from Montvale, New Jersey
American breakdancers
America's Got Talent contestants
Science communicators
University_of_California,_Los_Angeles_alumni
University of Wisconsin–Madison alumni